Daniel Matt is the name of:
 Danny Matt (1927–2013), military officer
 Daniel C. Matt, Kabbalah scholar